The 2009–10 Savannah State Lady Tigers basketball team competed in American basketball on behalf of Savannah State University and had a record of 9-21. The Lady Tigers were members of the NCAA Division I-AA, as an independent. The head coach was Cedric Hardy, who served his sixth year. The team played its home games at Tiger Arena in Savannah, Georgia.  The Lady Tigers entered the season seeking to improve on the 9-22 record posted in the 2008-09 season.

Coaching staff

Roster

Schedule

Awards
 Sophomore guard Crissa Jackson was named to the 2010 All Independent Second Team on March 31, 2010.

See also
 2009–10 Savannah State Tigers basketball team

References

Savannah State Lady Tigers
Savannah State Lady Tigers basketball seasons
Savannah State Lady Tigers basketball
Savannah State Lady Tigers basketball